Willian Popp (born April 13, 1994) is a Brazilian footballer who plays as a forward in Muangthong United of the Thai League 1.

Career 
He joined K League 2 side Busan IPark in March 2016.

References

External links

https://int.soccerway.com/players/willian-popp/328581/

1994 births
Living people
Brazilian footballers
Association football forwards
Brazilian expatriate footballers
Joinville Esporte Clube players
Mogi Mirim Esporte Clube players
Busan IPark players
Avispa Fukuoka players
Bucheon FC 1995 players
Figueirense FC players
Willian Popp
Associação Chapecoense de Futebol players
Campeonato Brasileiro Série A players
Campeonato Brasileiro Série B players
Campeonato Brasileiro Série C players
K League 2 players
J2 League players
Willian Popp
Expatriate footballers in South Korea
Brazilian expatriate sportspeople in South Korea
Expatriate footballers in Japan
Brazilian expatriate sportspeople in Japan
Expatriate footballers in Thailand
Brazilian expatriate sportspeople in Thailand